The Seymour Krieger House, also known as Katinas House, is a historic home located at Bethesda, Montgomery County, Maryland.  It was built in 1958, and is a one-story, steel-framed building constructed of all-stretcher coursed brick (painted white).  It features marlite panels with bands of large plate-glass windows and sliding-glass doors set within steel frames. It is set upon a concrete foundation.  The International style house is one of four residential buildings architect Marcel Breuer (1902-1981) designed in Maryland.  The landscaping was designed by Dan Kiley (1912-2004).

It was listed on the National Register of Historic Places in 2008.

References

External links
 at Maryland Historical Trust

Marcel Breuer buildings
Houses on the National Register of Historic Places in Maryland
Houses completed in 1958
Houses in Montgomery County, Maryland
Buildings and structures in Bethesda, Maryland
National Register of Historic Places in Montgomery County, Maryland